Luca Nostran (born 14 May 1993, in Camposampiero) is an Italian rugby union player.
His usual position is as a Flanker and he currently plays for Petrarca Padova in Top12.

For 2016–17 Pro12 season, he was an Additional Player for Benetton.

In 2016 and 2017, Nostran was also named in the Emerging Italy squad for annual World Rugby Nations Cup.

References

External links 
It's Rugby France Profile
ESPN Profile
Player Profile

Italian rugby union players
People from Camposampiero
1993 births
Living people
Rugby union flankers
Sportspeople from the Province of Padua
Benetton Rugby players
Petrarca Rugby players